Corby James Moore (born 21 November 1993) is an English footballer who plays as a midfielder for Poole Town.

Career

Southampton
After spending the entirety of his youth career at the Southampton Academy, Moore decided to sign a long term youth contract with Southampton in November 2011 and was named to Southampton's developmental squad. Moore made a singular appearance for Southampton, playing the final six minutes in a 4–1 win over Stevenage in League Cup second round tie in August 2012.

Indy Eleven
Moore joined Indy Eleven, signing a two-year deal on 11 March 2014.

Forest Green Rovers
On 4 January 2015, it was confirmed that Moore had returned to England to sign for Conference National side Forest Green Rovers. He made his debut for the club as a substitute in a 5–3 home win over Southport on 28 February 2015. On 4 May 2015, it was confirmed that he had been offered a new six-month contract for the 2015–16 season by Forest Green. On 10 June 2015, it was confirmed that Moore had signed a new six-month deal to stay at The New Lawn.

In September 2015, he joined Southern Premier Division side Poole Town on a one-month loan. He returned to Forest Green and was then immediately sent out on loan again to Poole Town's league rivals, Frome Town. On 31 January 2015, he was released at the end of his six-month contract by Forest Green.

Bishop's Stortford
In January 2016, Moore signed for National League South club Bishop's Stortford.

Chelmsford City
In July 2016, Moore signed for Chelmsford City, following former manager Rod Stringer to the club. With opportunities hard to come across, Moore only managed to play four games and on 30 September 2016, Rod Stringer announced he was released from the club.

Poole Town
Following Moore's release from Chelmsford, he re-joined former side Poole Town under Tom Killick.

Career statistics

References

External links
Poole Town stats

1993 births
Living people
Footballers from Southampton
English footballers
Association football midfielders
Southampton F.C. players
Indy Eleven players
Forest Green Rovers F.C. players
Poole Town F.C. players
Frome Town F.C. players
Bishop's Stortford F.C. players
Chelmsford City F.C. players
North American Soccer League players
National League (English football) players
English expatriate footballers
Expatriate soccer players in the United States
English expatriate sportspeople in the United States